The 2015 Premiership Rugby Sevens Series was the sixth Rugby Union 7-a-side competition for the twelve 2015–16 Aviva Premiership Clubs, and the second including the four Welsh Regions that compete in the Pro12.

The pool stage of the tournament started on 15 August 2015, before continuing on 20–22 August 2015. The final took place on 28 August 2015.

Format
The sixteen teams were split into four groups - A, B, C & D, based on geographical location. Each team in the group played each other once, to the World Rugby Laws of the Game - 7s Variations. Based on the result, teams received:
4 points for a win
2 points for a draw
1 bonus point for a loss by seven points or less
1 bonus point for scoring four or more tries in a match
Following all each group, the winner and runner up in each group progressed to the Final Stage.  In the final, the 8 teams (4 Winners and 4 Runners up) were arranged into 4 quarter-final pairings. The winners of each match qualified for the Cup semi-finals, with the losers moving into a new Plate competition. Thereafter, competition was a simple knockout bracket, with the winner of the Cup final being declared the series winner.

Group stage

Group A
Dates: Saturday August 15, 2015
Venue: BT Sport Cardiff Arms Park, Cardiff

The pool featured the Welsh Regions.

Group B
At Kingsholm, Gloucester on Thursday 20 August 2015.

Group C
At the Ricoh Arena, Coventry on Friday 21 August 2015.

Group D
At Kingston Park, Newcastle on Saturday 22 August 2015.

Final stage
Finals day was played at the Twickenham Stoop on Friday 28 August 2015.

The four pool winners played a quarter-final against a runner up from another pool. The winner of these quarter finals would compete in the cup competition, while the losers would compete in the plate competition.

Quarter-finals

Plate Competition

Plate Semi-finals

Plate Final

Cup Competition

Cup Semi-finals

Cup Final

References

2015–16
Sevens
2015–16 in Welsh rugby union
2015 rugby sevens competitions